Scythris binotiferella is a moth of the family Scythrididae. It was described by Émile Louis Ragonot in 1881. It is found in France and Spain.

References

binotiferella
Moths described in 1881